South Breeze School is an English-medium educational institution located in Dhaka, Bangladesh. Founded in 1986 by principal Zeenat Chowdhury, the original campus was located in Dhanmondi. The campus was relocated in 2000, and in 2004, a new additional section was opened in Uttara.

Academics
The school follows the British IGCSE syllabus and the students are taught for Ordinary level (O-level) examinations conducted by Edexcel International. The school has been one of the leading ones in Bangladesh in terms of O-level results since 1990, when the first batch of students graduated from the school. South Breeze students have consistently maintained a large presence at the annual Daily Star awards ceremonies for high-achieving O-level and A-level students, and have been selected as valedictorians in 2000 (Dibya Huq), 2004 (Asheque Shams) and 2010 (Intekhab Hossain).

References

Educational institutions of Uttara
Schools in Dhaka District
Educational institutions established in 1986
1986 establishments in Bangladesh